Buck v. Bell, 274 U.S. 200 (1927), is a decision of the United States Supreme Court, written by Justice Oliver Wendell Holmes, Jr., in which the Court ruled that a state statute permitting compulsory sterilization of the unfit, including the intellectually disabled, "for the protection and health of the state" did not violate the Due Process Clause of the Fourteenth Amendment to the United States Constitution.  Despite the changing attitudes in the coming decades regarding sterilization, the Supreme Court has never expressly overturned Buck v. Bell. It is widely believed to have been  weakened by Skinner v. Oklahoma, 316 U.S. 535 (1942), which involved compulsory sterilization of male habitual criminals (and came to a contrary result). Legal scholar and Holmes biographer G. Edward White, in fact, wrote, "the Supreme Court has distinguished the case [Buck v. Bell] out of existence". In addition, federal statutes, including the Rehabilitation Act of 1973 and the Americans with Disabilities Act of 1990, provide protections for people with disabilities, defined as both physical and mental impairments. 

Buck v. Bell is often cited as one of the worst Supreme Court rulings.

Background
The concept of eugenics was propounded in 1883 by Francis Galton, who also coined the name. The idea first became popular in the United States and had found proponents in Europe by the start of the 20th century; 42 of the 58 research papers presented at the First International Congress of Eugenics, held in London in 1912, were from American scientists. Indiana passed the first eugenics sterilization statute in 1907, but it was legally flawed. To remedy that situation, Harry Laughlin, of the Eugenics Record Office (ERO) at the Cold Spring Harbor Laboratory,  designed a model eugenic law that was reviewed by legal experts. In 1924, the Commonwealth of Virginia adopted a statute authorizing the compulsory sterilization of the intellectually disabled for the purpose of eugenics, a statute closely based on Laughlin's model.

Looking to determine if the new law would survive a legal challenge, on September 10, 1924, Albert Sidney Priddy, superintendent of the Virginia State Colony for Epileptics and Feebleminded, filed a petition with his board of directors to sterilize Carrie Buck. She was an 18-year-old patient at his institution who he claimed had a mental age of 9. Priddy maintained that Buck represented a genetic threat to society. According to him, Buck's 52-year-old mother possessed a mental age of 8, had a record of prostitution and immorality, and had three children without good knowledge of their paternity. Buck, one of those children, had been adopted and attended school for five years, reaching the level of sixth grade. However, according to Priddy, Buck eventually proved to be "incorrigible" and gave birth to an illegitimate child. Her adoptive family had her committed to the State Colony as "feeble-minded", feeling they were no longer capable of caring for her. It was later claimed that Buck's pregnancy was not caused by any "immorality" on her own part. In the summer of 1923, while her adoptive mother was away "on account of some illness," her adoptive mother's nephew allegedly raped Buck, and her later commitment has been described as an attempt by the family to save their reputation.

Case
While the litigation was making its way through the court system, Priddy died and his successor, John Hendren Bell, took up the case. The board of directors issued an order for the sterilization of Buck, and her guardian appealed the case to the Circuit Court of Amherst County, which sustained the decision of the Board. The case then moved to the Supreme Court of Appeals of Virginia.

The appellate court sustained the sterilization law as compliant with both the state and federal constitutions, and it then went to the United States Supreme Court. Buck and her guardian contended that the due process clause guarantees all adults the right to procreate which was being violated. They also made the argument that the Equal Protection Clause in the 14th Amendment was being violated since not all similarly situated people were being treated the same. The sterilization law was only for the "feeble-minded" at certain state institutions and made no mention of other state institutions or those who were not in an institution.

On May 2, 1927, in an 8–1 decision, the Court accepted that Buck, her mother and her daughter were "feeble-minded" and "promiscuous," and that it was in the state's interest to have her sterilized. The ruling legitimized Virginia's sterilization procedures until they were repealed in 1974.

The ruling was written by Oliver Wendell Holmes, Jr.  In support of his argument that the interest of "public welfare" outweighed the interest of individuals in their bodily integrity, he argued:

Holmes concluded his argument by citing Jacobson v. Massachusetts as a precedent for the decision, stating "Three generations of imbeciles are enough". The sole dissenter in the court, Justice Pierce Butler, a devout Catholic, did not write a dissenting opinion.

Carrie Buck was operated upon, receiving a compulsory salpingectomy (a form of tubal ligation). She was later paroled from the institution as a domestic worker to a family in Bland, Virginia. She was an avid reader until her death in 1983. Her daughter Vivian had been pronounced "feeble minded" after a cursory examination by ERO field worker Dr. Arthur Estabrook. According to his report, Vivian "showed backwardness", thus the "three generations" of the majority opinion. It is worth noting that the child did very well in school for the two years that she attended (she died of complications from measles in 1932), even being listed on her school's honor roll in April 1931.

Historian Paul A. Lombardo argued in 1985 that Buck was not "feeble-minded" at all, but that she had been put away to hide her rape, perpetrated by the nephew of her adoptive mother.  He also asserted that Buck's lawyer, Irving Whitehead, poorly argued her case, failed to call important witnesses, and was remarked by commentators to often not know what side he was on. It is now thought that this was not because of incompetence, but deliberate. Whitehead had close connections to the counsel for the institution and to Priddy.  Whitehead was a member of the governing board of the state institution in which Buck resided, had personally authorized Priddy's sterilization requests, and was a strong supporter of eugenic sterilization.

Effect of the ruling

The effect of Buck v. Bell was to legitimize eugenic sterilization laws in the United States as a whole. While many states already had sterilization laws on their books, their use was erratic and effects practically non-existent in every state except for California. After Buck v. Bell, dozens of states added new sterilization statutes, or updated their constitutionally non-functional ones already enacted, with statutes which more closely mirrored the Virginia statute upheld by the Court.

The Virginia statute that Buck v. Bell upheld was designed in part by the eugenicist Harry H. Laughlin, superintendent of Charles Benedict Davenport's Eugenics Record Office in Cold Spring Harbor, New York. Laughlin had, a few years previously, conducted studies on the enforcement of sterilization legislation throughout the country and had concluded that the reason for their lack of use was primarily that the physicians who would order the sterilizations were afraid of prosecution by patients upon whom they operated. Laughlin saw the need to create a "Model Law" that could withstand constitutional scrutiny, clearing the way for future sterilization operations. The Nazi jurists designing the German Law for the Prevention of Hereditarily Diseased Offspring based it largely on Laughlin's "Model Law", although development of that law preceded Laughlin's. Nazi Germany held Laughlin in such high regard that they arranged for him to receive an honorary doctorate from Heidelberg University in 1936. At the Subsequent Nuremberg trials after World War II, counsel for SS functionary Otto Hofmann explicitly cited Holmes's opinion in Buck v. Bell in his defense.

Sterilization rates under eugenic laws in the United States climbed from 1927 until Skinner v. Oklahoma, 316 U.S. 535 (1942). While Skinner v. Oklahoma did not specifically overturn Buck v. Bell, it created enough of a legal quandary to discourage many sterilizations. By 1963, sterilization laws were almost wholly out of use, though some remained officially on the books for many years. Language referring to eugenics was removed from Virginia's sterilization law, and the current law, passed in 1988 and amended in 2013, authorizes only the voluntary sterilization of those 18 and older, after the patient has given written consent and the doctor has informed the patient of the consequences as well as alternative methods of contraception.

The story of Carrie Buck's sterilization and the court case was made into a television drama in 1994, Against Her Will: The Carrie Buck Story. It was also referred to in 1934's sensational film Tomorrow's Children, and was covered in the October 2018 American Experience documentary "The Eugenics Crusade".

Although this opinion and eugenics remain widely condemned, the decision in the case has not been formally overturned. Buck v. Bell was cited as a precedent by the opinion of the court (part VIII) in Roe v. Wade, but not in support of abortion rights. To the contrary, Justice Blackmun quoted it to justify that the constitutional right to abortion is not unlimited. Blackmun claimed that the right to privacy was strong enough to prevent the state from protecting unborn life in the womb, but not strong enough to prevent a woman being sterilized against her will.

In the 1996 case of Fieger v. Thomas, the United States Court of Appeals for the Sixth Circuit both recognized and criticized Buck v. Bell by writing, "as Justice Holmes pointed out in the only part of Buck v. Bell that remains unrepudiated, a claim of a violation of the Equal Protection Clause based upon selective enforcement 'is the usual last resort of constitutional arguments. In 2001, the United States Court of Appeals for the Eighth Circuit cited Buck v. Bell to protect the constitutional rights of a woman coerced into sterilization without procedural due process. The court stated that error and abuse will result if the state does not follow the procedural requirements, established by Buck v. Bell, for performing an involuntary sterilization.

Derek Warden has shown how the decision in Buck v. Bell has been affected by the Americans with Disabilities Act.

See also

Eugenics in the United States
Virginia Sterilization Act of 1924
Racial Integrity Act of 1924
Stump v. Sparkman (1978)
Poe v. Lynchburg Training School and Hospital (1981)
Sex-related court cases in the United States
 List of United States Supreme Court cases, volume 274
Americans with Disabilities Act of 1990

References

Notes

Citations

Further reading
 
.
 Cullen-DuPont, Kathryn. Encyclopedia of Women's History in America (Infobase Publishing, 2009) pp 37–38

.

 Smith, J. David. The Sterilization of Carrie Buck (New Horizon Press, 1989)

External links

 An account of the case from the Dolan DNA Learning Center
 Buck v. Bell (Case File #31681), archives.gov
"Eugenics."  Claude Moore Health Sciences Library, University of Virginia
"Buck v. Bell (1927)" by N. Antonios and C. Raup at the Embryo Project Encyclopedia 
Buck v. Bell at Encyclopedia Virginia
 

Eugenics in the United States
Intellectual disability
Mental health law in the United States
Psychiatry controversies
United States disability case law
United States Supreme Court cases
United States Supreme Court cases of the Taft Court
United States substantive due process case law
United States equal protection case law
United States reproductive rights case law
Science and law
1927 in United States case law
Sterilization (medicine)
Amherst County, Virginia
Healthcare in Virginia
Oliver Wendell Holmes Jr.
Compulsory sterilization